Padimate A is an organic compound that is an ingredient in some sunscreens. It is an ester derivative of PABA. This aromatic chemical absorbs ultraviolet rays thereby preventing sunburn. However, its chemical structure and behaviour is similar to an industrial free radical generator. In Europe this chemical was withdrawn in 1989 for unstated reasons.
In the US it was never approved for use in sunscreens.

Photobiology
The photobiological properties of padimate O and padimate A resemble that of Michler's ketone. These compounds have been shown to increase the lethal effects of UV-radiation on cells.  This photochemistry is relevant to the sunscreen controversy.

See also 
Padimate O, a related sunscreen ingredient

References

4-Aminobenzoate esters
Sunscreening agents